The Community for Democracy and Rights of Nations, also commonly and colloquially known as the Commonwealth of Unrecognized States, rarely as CIS-2, is an international organization in Eastern Europe uniting several states in the former Soviet Union, all of which have limited to no recognition from the international community.

History

An agreement on creating the commonwealth was reached by the four separatist states of Abkhazia, South Ossetia, Transnistria and Artsakh in 2001 at the foreign ministers meeting held in Stepanakert, the capital of Artsakh.  The Community for Democracy and Human Rights was established on 14 June 2006 in Sukhumi, Abkhazia, by the presidents of three of these states: Sergei Bagapsh representing Abkhazia, Eduard Kokoity representing South Ossetia and Igor Smirnov representing Transnistria.  Artsakh, which had been part of the 2001 agreement, left in 2004 but became a member in 2007.  All four member states have limited international recognition: Abkhazia and South Ossetia are claimed by Georgia, Transnistria by Moldova and Artsakh by Azerbaijan.

On 17 June 2007, the four-state Community for Democracy and Peoples' Rights signed in Tiraspol—the capital of Transnistria—the joint Declaration on principles of peaceful and fair settlement of the Georgian–Abkhazian, Georgian–Ossetian, Azeri–Karabakh and Moldovan–Transnistrian conflicts. It calls for barring all types of pressure, such as military deployments, diplomatic isolation, economic blockades, or information wars, during negotiations toward resolution of conflicts. It also calls for external guarantees to eventual political settlements of these conflicts.

On 27 September 2009 the members of the Community for Democracy and Peoples' Rights agreed to abolish the visa regimes for their citizens. The agreement came into effect one month after its ratification by all three parliaments. It lasted for five years, after which it was automatically extended for another five-year term. This agreement excludes Artsakh, who reserved the right to join this agreement at a later date.

As of 2017, the four member states have a combined population of 947,480 people. Abkhazia and South Ossetia have secured recognition from United Nations member states such as Venezuela, Nicaragua, Nauru, Russia and Syria, as well as the Sahrawi Republic. Meanwhile, political leaders of Abkhazia, South Ossetia, and Transnistria have all promised to integrate their economies and perhaps seek membership in the Russian-led Eurasian Union.

Members

Administrative centres
 Sukhumi, Abkhazia
 Stepanakert, Artsakh
 Tskhinvali, South Ossetia
 Tiraspol, Transnistria

See also 		
 Commonwealth of Independent States	
 Community of Democratic Choice	
 Community of Democracies		
 Eastern Partnership	
 Eurasian Economic Union	
 Euronest Parliamentary Assembly	
 European integration	
 Foreign relations of Artsakh	
 GUAM Organization for Democracy and Economic Development	
 List of active separatist movements in Europe	
 Politics of Europe	
 Regions of Europe	
 Self-determination
 South Caucasus
 Unrepresented Nations and Peoples Organization

References

External links
Community for Democracy and Human Rights – Official Website  
Joint Statement by Transnistria, Abkhazia and South Ossetia

Foreign relations of Transnistria
Foreign relations of South Ossetia
Foreign relations of the Republic of Artsakh
Post-Soviet alliances
Foreign relations of Abkhazia
Organizations established in 2006
2006 establishments in Georgia (country)
International organizations based in Europe
International political organizations
European integration